Malik Rouag (born 12 January 1983 in France) is a French footballer.

References

French footballers
Living people
1983 births
Association football midfielders
Association football forwards
Pau FC players
AS Beauvais Oise players
US Albi players
Grenoble Foot 38 players
AS Poissy players